BC Mgzavrebi, also known as Mgzavrebi Tbilisi, is a professional basketball club based in Tbilisi, that plays in the Georgian Super Liga. The club was affiliated to the Georgian Ministry of Defense.

History
Armia traces its roots to the first army sports club of Tbilisi, which was formed in 1937 and went on to win the USSR basketball championship twice, in 1944 and 1946. A reformed Army Sports Club (ASK) then participated in the Georgian national championship for three seasons, between 1996 and 1999.

The current club was re-established in 2010, and made its debut in the Superliga on November 6 of that year. Coached by Levan Moseshvili, they established themselves as the strongest team in the country straight away, winning the championship title by defeating TSU Tbilisi 3-1 in the play-off finals. They also won the Georgian Cup, and the Georgian Super Cup that year.

For the 2011–12 season, the coaching role was taken up by former player and club captain Kote Tugushi. The club signed a number of high-profile foreign players, including some with NBA experience, such as Sundiata Gaines, Jeremy Richardson and Guillermo Diaz. Armia competed on international stage in EuroChallenge competition, where they were narrowly eliminated at the group stage. However, they convincingly retained the Superliga title by finishing the regular season without a loss, and defeating BC Olimpi 3-1 in the play-off finals. They once again completed a clean sweep of trophies by winning the Cup and the Super Cup.

The club went into the 2012-13 season with a strong squad that included experienced international players such as Curtis Millage, Marcus Faison and Lamayne Wilson. Nevertheless, Armia were once again eliminated at the group stage of EuroChallenge. A decision by the Ministry of Defence to reduce its funding of the club led to the departure of all foreign players in December. With an all-Georgian squad, Armia still managed to finish in a respectable 3rd position in the Superliga play-offs. However, the club ended the season without a major domestic trophy for the first time since its reformation in 2010.

Season by season

Roster

External links
Official website
Team Profile

Basketball teams in Georgia (country)
Sport in Tbilisi
Basketball teams in the Soviet Union